Fistmele, also known as the "brace height", is an older term used in archery to describe the correct distance (about seven inches, for a Northern European or English longbow) between a bow and its string.

Different brace heights may be obtained from the same length of string by twisting it around before affixing it to the bow.  A proper height helps to reduce noise upon the release of an arrow and vibrations in the bow itself.  Consequently, if the distance is too small excess noise and poor arrow flight are the results. A bow is said to be "overstrung" when this distance is exceeded.

See also
Archery
Bow string
Archery Trade Association standards

References

Archery
Units of length
Human-based units of measurement